The École internationale bilingue (EIB) is a French teaching establishment, primarily based in Paris. The school teaches children from 4 to 18, from kindergarten to Baccalauréat and IB Diploma Programme.

Origins 

Following the war, Jeannine Manuel had a mission: to work on international understanding through bilingual education, the mixing of cultures, and a constant educational drive to listen to the world, so in 1954 she created the École active bilingue (EAB) with the two "girls' establishments" which are today the École internationale bilingue (EIB) and the École Jeannine Manuel (EABJM). The first site of the EAB was a building on avenue de La Bourdonnais, which closed at the start of the 1990s.

Functioning of the school 

The kindergarten and primary classes take place at 6, Avenue Van-Dyck.

The college is located at 16, Rue Margueritte.

The lycée is at 9, Rue Villaret-de-Joyeuse.

Alumni 

Vincent Ferniot (1960-), French chef
Benjamin Cuq (1974-), French journalist and writer.
Kaysha (1974-), French singer.
Amanda Sthers (1978-), French writer and director.
Davy Sardou (1978-), French writer.
Tristane Banon (1979-), French writer.
Nicolas Bedos (1980-), French humourist.
Virgile Bramly (1980-), French actor.
Eva Green (1980-), French actress.
Julia Restoin Roitfeld (1980-), French model.
Julien Sibony (1980-), French director.
Guillaume Houzé (1981-), French producer.
Raphaël Hamburger (1981-), French producer.
Dimitri Rassam (1981-), French producer.
 Arthur Mamou-Mani (1983-), French architect.
Marilou Berry (1983-), French actress.
Salomé Lelouch (1983-), French producer.

Notes and references

External links 
 Site officiel de l'école

EIB
EIB
EIB
EIB
Educational institutions established in 1954
1954 establishments in France